The Westminster Schools is a Kindergarten –12 private school in Atlanta, Georgia, United States, founded in 1951.

History
Westminster originated in 1951 as a reorganization of Atlanta's North Avenue Presbyterian School (NAPS), a girls' school and an affiliate of the North Avenue Presbyterian Church. Dr. William L. Pressly of Chattanooga, Tennessee's McCallie School served as Westminster's first president. The school moved to its current campus in 1953 as the result of a land grant by trustee Fritz Orr.

Also in 1953, Washington Seminary, another private school for girls, founded by two of George Washington's great-nieces in 1878, merged with Westminster. The resulting school was co-educational until the sixth grade, with separate schools for boys and girls continuing through the twelfth grade, a practice that continued until 1986 and provided the basis of Westminster's plural name.

In the mid-1950s, Westminster became a test site for a new advanced studies program that would later become the College Board's Advanced Placement program.  In 1962, the administration building, later named Pressly Hall, was constructed, bringing the number of permanent buildings on campus to four.

In the early 1960s, the school barred black students and only rarely allowed African-Americans on campus.

In 1965, the school's trustees voted to adopt a non-discriminatory admissions policy.

Until 1978, the school also operated as a boarding school. Using Tull Hall as a dormitory.

In 2006 the school ran a campaign attempting to raise $100 million to further increase its endowment size. The campaign was at the time the third-largest ever for an independent school in the United States.

Campus

A new campus road, completed in June 2004, rerouted traffic away from central campus. In addition to a new junior high facility, completed in August 2005, Westminster has five main high school academic buildings – Campbell Hall (1952), Askew Hall (1951), and Robinson Hall (1992), Broyles Hall (1987), and Pressly Hall (1962). Pressly Hall houses administrative offices, the Malone Dining Hall, and McCain Chapel. Turner Gymnasium underwent major construction and expansion completed in 2000. Broyles Arts Center houses the orchestra, band, theater, and art programs, and also the Campus Center, an area for students to socialize during free time that includes a concession stand, which is currently used periodically by the middle school band(as of 2022). The recently renovated Scott Hall (2013), once nearly obsolete after the construction of the Junior High School building, now houses the campus bookstore and technology department. Love Hall (1995) serves as the elementary school. Tull Hall, which was once the dorm rooms for boarding students now serves as a preschool. Barge Commons (2021) serves as the “front door” of the campus, housing a chapel overlooking the high school buildings lining both sides, a computer lab, snack bar, and admissions office, as well as many places for students to relax and socialize. 

The campus hosted the Atlanta Marathon from 1964 until 1980. During the 1996 Atlanta Olympics, the Torch was run through campus. The floor used for the basketball games during the Olympics is now in the school's Lower School gymnasium.

Westminster is currently implementing an extensive campus renovation to enhance teacher-student connection. Campbell Hall received a complete renovation, a new 28,000-square-foot upper school academic building (Hawkins Hall) was built, and a new parking deck was completed. The main athletic stadium was rebuilt, along with a community plaza. Westminster Center, a large community gathering space, is under construction.

Athletics
Westminster fields 84 athletic teams, including baseball, basketball (boys' and girls'), cheerleading (football and basketball), crew, cross country (boys' and girls'), football, golf (boys' and girls'), gymnastics, lacrosse (boys' and girls'), soccer (boys' and girls'), softball, swimming and diving (boys' and girls'), tennis (boys' and girls'), track and field (boys' and girls'), volleyball, squash, and wrestling.

For the 2012–13 school year, Westminster was named the nation's best overall sports program for its eleven state championships and four second-place finishes. Nearly a decade later, for the 2021-22 school year, Westminster was again named the nation's best overall sports program with ten state championships, two second-place finishes, and a final four appearance from the boys' soccer team.

These teams have won 290 state championships since 1951, including seven in the 2016–17 school year. Westminster has received the Georgia Athletic Directors' Association Director's Cup in its respective classification in 17 of the 18 years it has been awarded, 2000–2008 and 2010–2017. The varsity boys' tennis team won the Georgia State High School AAA State Championship in ten seasons in a row, 1999–2009. The boys' team has yielded many Division 1 NCAA scholarship tennis players over the years, and it has won several regional tournaments as well. The men's and women's swimming & diving teams have won 34 state championships under former coach Pete Higgins, whose accolades through 51 years of coaching include membership in the Georgia Aquatics Hall of Fame, recognition of January 5, 1990 as Pete Higgins Day by the City of Atlanta, among others. Westminster fields the sole varsity squash team south of Woodberry Forest School in Virginia featuring full interscholastic competition; the team placed 16th in the 2004 U.S. National High School Team Championships, held at Yale University, and the Squash Cats also won the title in 2012, 2016, and 2018.

In 2014, Westminster moved up a class from AA to AAA. In 2015, Westminster's football team won the AAA state championship for the first time in 37 years against rival Blessed Trinity Catholic High School in overtime, with a final score of 38–31. In 2016, Westminster's baseball team won the AAA state championship for the first time in 41 years, also against Blessed Trinity Catholic High School, sweeping the championship series in a pair of one-run victories. Westminster's boys and girls soccer teams have won the most state championships in Georgia High School history. The 2019 boys team also finished the season ranked #1 in the nation by MaxPreps meanwhile the 2021 girls team finished as the unanimous #1 team in the nation and again by MaxPreps in 2022.

Extracurricular activities
Westminster places a great deal of focus on extracurricular clubs and activities, with students and faculty devoting time before, during, and after school to these activities. Among the academic extracurricular pursuits are an academic quiz team, debate team, math team, and math honors society.

Only one year of art is required, but many extracurricular opportunities in that field are available to students, including a vocal ensemble and men's and women's a cappella groups, as well as a symphonic band, chorus, orchestra, and theater program.

Student publications include Lynx, the annual yearbook, The Westminster Bi-Line, a monthly newspaper publication, Crossroads, a literary magazine in languages other than English, Embryo, an arts, music, and literature magazine, and Evolutions, a poetry and creative writing periodical.

Religious and cultural groups on campus showcase the diverse heritage of the student body. A student-run Christian Life Committee oversees that aspect of student life, including many Bible studies and a branch of the Fellowship of Christian Athletes. Other groups of this type include Tikkun Olam, a Jewish fellowship club for junior high students; Nosh, an all-encompassing religious discussion group; and Far Out Far East, a cultural club that explores Eastern cultures and traditions.

Freshman go through a two-week Discovery program, and seniors can be members of Peer Leadership, a guidance and counseling program for freshmen.

WCAT
WCAT, the school's broadcast program, streams events and school activities online. In the 2016–17 school year, more than 45 students from all three divisions helped stream more than 220 events. Since its inception in 2010, the program has won 8 awards and 7 honorable mentions from the National Academy of Television Arts and Sciences Southeast division. In 2017, WCAT won its first-ever National Student Production Award from NATAS for Best Sports – Live Event Broadcast.

Policy debate
The Policy Debate team has won 16 state championships as well as many large national tournaments, including the national Tournament of Champions five times. The team also won the National Debate Coaches' Association Championships in 2007, 2014, and 2017. The team has produced more national championships in the last decade than any other school in the country and has received the Baker Cup, the award for the top ranked team in the country, three times in 2007, 2009, and 2011.

Robotics
The robotics team at Westminster began in 2008 and is identified as FRC Team 2415, the WiredCats. The team has qualified for the FRC international championships every year since their inception, more than any other team in the state. They placed 5th at the Houston International Championships in 2017 after winning their subdivision at the International Championships, being one of few teams in Georgia to have made it to the Einstein Field Bracket. The team won the Peachtree District Championship in 2018 and 2019. They have many other accolades including ten regional/district event wins in 2009, 2011, 2012, 2015, 2017, 2018 and 2019, the chairman's award in 2010, and the engineering inspiration award in 2011, 2012, 2013, 2014, 2017, and 2018.

Notable people

Alumni

Notable alumni of Westminster include:
 Margaret Mitchell (Washington Seminary, 1918), author, Gone with the Wind
 Evelyn Greenblatt Howren (North Avenue Presbyterian School, 1934), pioneering woman aviator
 Dorothy Kirby (Washington Seminary, 1938), sportscaster and golf champion
 Lynne Rudder Baker (1962), philosopher, University of Massachusetts Amherst
 Jeff Galloway (1963), Olympic 10k runner 1972
 Taylor Branch (1964), historian and author
 James H. Shepherd, Jr. (1969), chairman of the board, Shepherd Center, the United States' largest catastrophic care hospital
 Daniel R. White (1971), author
 Clark Howard (1973), consumer advocate and nationally syndicated radio talk show host
 Helen Ballard (1973), founder and chief executive officer of Ballard Designs; independent director of Oxford Industries
 Michael McChesney (1974), founder and chairman, Security First Network Bank
 Lisa Borders (1975), president of WNBA (Women's National Basketball Association), Atlanta City Council; serves as trustee of school
 Jennifer Chandler (1977), Olympic gold in 3 meter springboard diving, 1976 Summer Olympics
 Hannah Storm (1979), co-host of The Early Show and anchor for ESPN's SportsCenter
 Stan Whitmire (1980), GMA Dove Award-winning pianist and recording artist
 Phillip Alvelda (1982), co-founder, chairman and CEO, MobiTV
 Shuler Hensley (1985), Broadway actor
 Laurie Dhue (1986), former anchor (2000–2008), Fox News Channel
 Lauren Myracle (1987), author
 Marc Lipsitch (1987), Professor at the Harvard T.H. Chan School of Public Health
 Rob Kutner (1990), writer, The Daily Show
 Brian Baumgartner (1991), actor, The Office
 Ed Helms (1992), actor, The Office, The Hangover, former correspondent for The Daily Show
 Brooke Baldwin (1997), news anchor, CNN
 Sedrick Hodge (1997), former NFL linebacker
 Jennifer Stumm (1997), concert violist
 Morgan Jahnig (1998), stand-up bassist, Old Crow Medicine Show
 Kaki King (1998), musician
 Will Welch (1999), editor-in-chief of GQ
 Ansley Cargill (2000), professional tennis player, WTA Tour
 Julian Dorio (2000), musician, The Whigs
 Sarah Hawkins Warren (2000), Judge, Supreme Court of Georgia
 Sada Jacobson (2000), 2008 Summer Olympics silver medalist and 2004 Summer Olympics bronze medalist, sabre
 Noah Britton (2001), of Asperger's Are Us
 Parker Gispert (2001), musician, The Whigs
 Charles Judson Wallace (2001), professional basketball player
 Hamilton Jordan, Jr. (2002), musician
 Carter Hawkins (2003), General Manager for the Chicago Cubs
 Emily Jacobson (2004), 2004 Olympic fencer
 Gordon Beckham (2005), professional baseball player, 2009 winner of The Sporting News Rookie of the Year Award
 Kathleen Jordan (2007), creator of the Netflix original series Teenage Bounty Hunters
 Thomas Fellows (author) (2008), author of Forget Self-Help: Re-Examining the Golden Rule
 Harrison Butker (2013), kicker for Kansas City Chiefs of the National Football League
Tyler Mitchell (2013), photographer who was the first African-American to shoot the cover of Vogue
 Will Benson (2016), baseball player for Cincinnati Reds of Major League Baseball, selected 14th overall in 2016 MLB Draft
 Blake Gillikin (2016), punter for New Orleans Saints of the National Football League

Faculty
 Cynthia Potter, Olympic bronze in 3 meter springboard diving, 1976
 Mike Swider, head football coach at Wheaton College, 1995–present; coach at Westminster 1978-1985 (including Class AAA State title in 1978 and state playoffs in three other seasons)

In popular culture
 The film The Blind Side was filmed on the school's campus in June 2009, with students, parents, teachers and coaches acting as extras.
 In Lauren Myracle’s The Winnie Years, Winnie Perry starts attending the school in the seventh-grade.

References

External links
The Westminster Schools

Educational institutions established in 1951
Private K-12 schools in Atlanta
Schools accredited by the Southern Association of Colleges and Schools
1951 establishments in Georgia (U.S. state)